The following highways are numbered 42.

International
 Asian Highway 42
 European route E42

Australia
 National Route 42 - part of Cunningham Highway

Canada

Alberta

 Alberta Highway 42

Manitoba

 Manitoba Highway 42
 Winnipeg Route 42

Ontario

Chatham-Kent Road 42
Elgin County Road 42
 County Road 42 (Essex County, Ontario)
Greater Sudbury Road 42
Halton Regional Road 42
Leeds and Grenville County Road 42 (former  Ontario Highway 42)
Middlesex County Road 42
Muskoka Road 42
Niagara Regional Road 42
Norfolk County Road 42
Ottawa Road 42
Renfrew County Road 42
 Simcoe County Road 42
Wellington County Road 42

Saskatchewan

 Saskatchewan Highway 42

China 
  G42 Expressway

Hungary
  Main road 42 (Hungary)

India
  National Highway 42 (India)

Israel
 Highway 42 (Israel)

Japan
 Japan National Route 42
 Hanwa Expressway
 Kisei Expressway

Korea, South
 National Route 42

Poland
 National Road 42 (Poland)

United Kingdom
 English A42 (Appleby Magna-Kegworth)
 Northern Ireland A42 (Maghera-Carnlough)
 British M42 (Appleby Magna-Bromsgrove)

United States
 Interstate 42 (proposed)
 U.S. Route 42
 Alabama State Route 42 (former)
 Arkansas Highway 42
 California State Route 42 (former)
 County Route J42 (California)
 Colorado State Highway 42
 Connecticut Route 42
 Delaware Route 42
 Florida State Road 42 (former)
 County Road 42 (Lake County, Florida)
 County Road 42 (Marion County, Florida)
 Georgia State Route 42
 Georgia State Route 42A (former)
 Illinois Route 42 (former)
 Illinois Route 42A (former)
 Indiana State Road 42
 Iowa Highway 42 (former)
 K-42 (Kansas highway)
 Louisiana Highway 42
 Louisiana State Route 42 (former)
 Maryland Route 42
Maryland Route 42A
 M-42 (Michigan highway)
 Minnesota State Highway 42
 County Road 42 (Dakota County, Minnesota)
 County Road 42 (Ramsey County, Minnesota)
 County Road 42 (Scott County, Minnesota)
 Mississippi Highway 42
 Missouri Route 42
 Montana Highway 42
 Nebraska Highway 42 (former)
 Nebraska Spur 42A
 Nevada State Route 42 (former)
 New Jersey Route 42
 County Route 42 (Bergen County, New Jersey)
 County Route 42 (Monmouth County, New Jersey)
 New Mexico State Road 42
 New York State Route 42
 County Route 42 (Allegany County, New York)
 County Route 42 (Cattaraugus County, New York)
County Route 42B (Cayuga County, New York)
 County Route 42 (Chautauqua County, New York)
 County Route 42 (Chenango County, New York)
 County Route 42 (Dutchess County, New York)
 County Route 42 (Erie County, New York)
 County Route 42 (Genesee County, New York)
 County Route 42 (Herkimer County, New York)
 County Route 42 (Livingston County, New York)
 County Route 42 (Madison County, New York)
 County Route 42 (Putnam County, New York)
 County Route 42 (Rensselaer County, New York)
 County Route 42 (Rockland County, New York)
 County Route 42 (Schoharie County, New York)
 County Route 42 (St. Lawrence County, New York)
 County Route 42 (Suffolk County, New York)
 County Route 42 (Ulster County, New York)
 County Route 42 (Warren County, New York)
 County Route 42 (Washington County, New York)
 County Route 42 (Wyoming County, New York)
 North Carolina Highway 42
 North Dakota Highway 42
 Ohio State Route 42 (1923-1927) (former)
 Oklahoma State Highway 42
 Oregon Route 42
 Pennsylvania Route 42
 South Carolina Highway 42 (1920s) (former)
 South Dakota Highway 42
 Tennessee State Route 42 (former)
 Texas State Highway 42
 Texas State Highway 42 (pre-1939) (former)
 Texas State Highway Loop 42
 Texas Park Road 42
 Utah State Route 42
 Virginia State Route 42
 West Virginia Route 42
 Wisconsin Highway 42

Territories
 Puerto Rico Highway 42
 U.S. Virgin Islands Highway 42

See also
42nd Street (disambiguation)
A42 (disambiguation)#Roads